I and M Electric Co. Building-Transformer House and Garage are three historic buildings located at South Bend, St. Joseph County, Indiana.  The garage was built in 1929, and is a three-story, rectangular brick building.  It features decorative coping and belt courses and a parapet. the transformer house is a -story brick building with terra cotta coping constructed in 1929.  The I and M Electric Co. Building was built in 1911, and is a four- to five-story, Classical Revival style brick and stone building. The buildings were built for the Indiana and Michigan Electric Company, which operated an electric plant on the site into the 1970s.

It was listed on the National Register of Historic Places in 1999.

See also
I&M Building

References

Industrial buildings and structures on the National Register of Historic Places in Indiana
Neoclassical architecture in Indiana
Industrial buildings completed in 1911
Buildings and structures in South Bend, Indiana
National Register of Historic Places in St. Joseph County, Indiana